Blaine Golden is a South African rugby union player for the  in the Currie Cup. His regular position is prop.

Golden was a mid-season addition to the  side for the 2022 Currie Cup Premier Division.

References

South African rugby union players
Living people
Rugby union props
Sharks (Currie Cup) players
2001 births